Richard Friedrich Wetzell (born 5 August 1961) is an American historian specializing in German criminology and research fellow at the German Historical Institute.

He graduated from Swarthmore College and specialized in European history at Columbia University and Stanford University, where he earned a master's degree and doctorate, respectively.

Selected publications

References

1961 births
Living people
21st-century American historians
Historians of Germany
American criminologists
Swarthmore College alumni
Stanford University alumni
Columbia Graduate School of Arts and Sciences alumni
German Historical Institute, Washington, DC